Peter Shaw Green (11 September 1920–17 August 2009) was an English botanist.

Early life
Green was born in Rochester, Kent, the youngest son of John and Elizabeth (née Hainsworth) Green, his father a civilian engineer with the Royal Air Force. He was educated at Taunton School, before studying botany at King's College London. His studies were interrupted by the Second World War, in which he served as an Adjutant (Captain) in the Northumberland Fusiliers, initially training recruits to shoot, but later joining his regiment in Italy, where he contracted typhoid. Upon recovery, he was despatched to Greece. In 1946, while still in uniform, he married Winifred Brown, whom he had met at King's College before the war. After demobilization, he returned to his studies at King's College.

Career
After graduation, Green was appointed Assistant Lecturer at Birmingham University before joining the Royal Botanic Garden, Edinburgh in 1952. In 1961, he moved to the Arnold Arboretum of Harvard University to become Horticultural Taxonomist, but returned to England in 1966 to join the Herbarium of the Royal Botanic Gardens Kew, ultimately rising to the rank of Deputy Director and Curator. Both institutions had special links to the botany of China, and between 10 May and 18 June 1978 Green visited China as host of the Academia Sinica with John Simmons, curator of the Royal Botanic Gardens.

Retirement
Upon obligatory retirement in 1982, Green continued his researches at Kew as an Honorary Research Fellow, concentrating on his favourite flora, Oleaceae and Jasminium. He continued to serve as Vice-President of the Kew Guild, becoming President from 1982 to 1983. He also travelled widely, notably to the islands of the western Pacific, whose flora had preoccupied him during his career at Kew.

Awards
Kew Medal, 1984
DSc King's College, 1997

Publications

References

External links  

1920 births
2009 deaths
Alumni of King's College London
Botanists active in Kew Gardens
British botanists
People educated at Taunton School
Royal Northumberland Fusiliers officers